The men's 1500 metres at the 2007 World Championships in Athletics was held at the Nagai Stadium on 25, 27 and 29 August.

Medalists

Records
Prior to the competition, the following records were as follows.

Schedule

Results

Heats
Qualification: First 6 in each heat (Q) and the next 6 fastest (q) advance to the semifinals.

Semifinals
Qualification: First 6 in each semifinal (Q) and the next 2 fastest (q) advance to the final.

Note: Mehdi Baala originally won the spot in the final but was later disqualified for causing a collision during his race. Additional spots in the final were awarded to Juan Carlos Higuero and Youssef Baba who suffered in that collision.

Final

References
General
1500 metres results from IAAF. IAAF
Specific

1500 metres
1500 metres at the World Athletics Championships